Neurothrips magnafemoralis is a species of tube-tailed thrip in the family Phlaeothripidae. It is found in Central America, North America, and Oceania.

References

Further reading

 
 
 
 

Phlaeothripidae
Articles created by Qbugbot
Insects described in 1902